Turbid may refer to:

Turbidity, cloudiness in a liquid
Turbid Creek (Alaska), a stream in Alaska, US
Turbid Creek (British Columbia), a stream in British Columbia, Canada
Turbid Lake, a lake in Wyoming
Turbid Lake (Minnesota), a lake in Minnesota

See also 
 Turbidity current
 Turbidite, a type of rock